Raja Narendra Singh is an Indian politician from the state of Uttarakhand, India. Raja Narendra Singh was a member of the Bharatiya Lok Dal, representing the Laksar Vidhan Sabha Constituency. He is the present titular king of Gurjar Landhaura state and father of Kunwar Pranav Singh.

References 

Year of birth missing (living people)
Living people
Bharatiya Lok Dal politicians